The Land of the Dead is a Big Finish Productions audio drama based on the long-running British science fiction television series Doctor Who.

Plot
Hovering just above Alaska in 1964, the TARDIS picks up some strange energy emissions of a type the Doctor and Nyssa cannot make head nor tail of. Before they can try, they are forced to dematerialise to avoid a collision with a light aircraft. But the TARDIS is apparently following a scent and takes them to the same place thirty years later. There they encounter a new kind of habitat, occupied by the obsessive Englishman Brett, Monica his interior designer and Tulung, the half-Inuit, brought up in America.

Something in the snowy wastes of Alaska doesn't seem to want this new intrusion, and before long it appears as if the local spirits, revered by the Inuit, scorned by Brett, may be making some drastic attempts to erase Brett's structure and the secrets it contains from the face of the planet. If the Doctor can discover exactly what Brett has been doing, he may find a way to halt the assault, but Nyssa seems to be "in tune" with the spirits – although she doesn’t entirely like what she sees...

Cast
The Doctor — Peter Davison
Nyssa — Sarah Sutton
Monica Lewis — Lucy Campbell
Supplier — Alistair Lock
Shaun Brett — Christopher Scott
Tulung — Neil Roberts
Gaborik — Andrew Fettes

Notes
The compact disc release includes a floor plan of the building where most of the action takes place, to aid the listener in following the action.
Nyssa and the Doctor speculate that the monsters in this story were involved in the Permian-Triassic extinction event, a massive reduction in Earth's biodiversity some 251.1 million years ago. They also make reference to events of the television serial Earthshock, which provides an explanation for the similar Cretaceous–Paleogene extinction event.

External links
Big Finish Productions – The Land of the Dead

Fifth Doctor audio plays
2000 audio plays
Fiction set in 1964
Fiction set in 1994